The Shanghai International Literary Festival is an annual event held each March in China's largest city, Shanghai.

21st century's new literary event
The Shanghai International Literary Festival, started in 2003, began as a sister festival to the Hong Kong International Literary Festival.  Hosted at M on the Bund and the Glamour Bar, the Festival grew from small beginnings to China’s leading, and largest, English-language literary event. At its peak (2006-2013), the Festival extended over three weekends with a roster of over 50 international and local authors and an audience of more than 4,000. With the closing of the Glamour Bar in 2014, the Festival has been reduced in size and duration, running for 10 days and featuring 25 authors. Its programs include winners of the world's leading literary prizes, including the Man Booker, National Book Award for Fiction, the Miles Franklin award and others.

The Festival was started by Michelle Garnaut, Jenny Laing Peach and Tina Kanagaratnam in 2003 and attracts authors from around the world and at home in China, for a celebration of the best in fiction, literary non-fiction, journalism, poetry and children’s writing. Activities include interactive forums, sessions in other languages such as Mandarin, Italian and French, as well as popular sessions with well-known writers including Man Booker Prize winners John Banville, Allan Hollinghurst, Thomas Keneally, Kiran Desai and Anne Enright.  The Festival has hosted such celebrities as Simpsons creator Matt Groening, Amy Tan, Jan Morris, Shirley Hazzard and the legendary Gore Vidal, as well as sessions with well respected and established writers such as Ma Jian, Christopher Kremmer, John Man, Anna Funder, Simon Winchester and Hari Kunzru as well as participation from emerging authors such as Guo Xiaolu, Wang Xiaoli, Priya Basil, James Bradley, Kunal Basu and Mishi Saran.

See also
Paula Morris writes about her experience at attending the festival in 2006

References

Podcasts
Podcasts of the 2008 Festival
Podcasts of the 2009 Festival

External links
Hong Kong International Literary Festival

Literary festivals in China
Festivals in Shanghai
Spring (season) events in China